Tinissa errantia is a moth of the family Tineidae. It was described by Robinson in 1976. It is found on the Philippines.

References

Moths described in 1976
Scardiinae